Sir Edward Mortimer Archibald,  (10 May 1810 – 8 February 1884) was a British diplomat, a lawyer and an office holder active during the transition to responsible government in the colony of Newfoundland.

Archibald was born in Truro, Nova Scotia, the son of Samuel George William Archibald and Elizabeth Dickson.  His father was a lawyer and attorney general for Nova Scotia.  Archibald studied law in his father's office and was admitted to the bar of Nova Scotia in early 1831. The following October, Archibald was appointed chief clerk and registrar of the Supreme Court of Newfoundland, replacing his brother in that position. By 1833, Archibald was an acting assistant judge of the Newfoundland Supreme Court. At the same time, he took on the additional job of chief clerk of the Newfoundland General Assembly.

Beginning in 1857, Archibald served as British consul to New York, a position he held for twenty-six years until his retirement on 1 January 1883.  From 1871 he also undertook the additional responsibility of acting as British consul-general for New York, New Jersey, Delaware, Rhode Island, and Connecticut.

Archibald married Catherine Elizabeth Richardson, on 10 September 1834 at Truro, Nova Scotia. Catherine bore him six children, but only one son, Edward.  The last child was a daughter, Edith Archibald, who became a suffragist and writer. Archibald died from pneumonia in Steyning, Sussex and is buried in the Brighton Extra Mural Cemetery.

Notes

External links 
 
Biography at the Dictionary of Canadian Biography Online

1810 births
1884 deaths
19th-century British North American people
British consuls
19th-century Canadian lawyers
Canadian people of Ulster-Scottish descent
Deaths from pneumonia in England
Canadian Knights Commander of the Order of St Michael and St George
People from Truro, Nova Scotia
Newfoundland Colony judges
British expatriates in the United States